The Father Christmas film series is an American/Canadian trilogy, starring Erin Krakow and Niall Matter, based on the novels of Robin Jones Gunn. The films were originally broadcast in the USA on Hallmark Movies & Mysteries, as part of the channels' "Miracles of Christmas" seasonal programming.

The films follow the story of Miranda Chester (Krakow), as she visits the cozy sundown town of Carlton Heath, Vermont, in search of the truth about her parentage. Whilst there she meets, and falls in love with, local lawyer/hotelier Ian McKendrick(Matter).

Main cast
 A dark grey cell indicates the character was not in the film.

Author Robin Jones Gunn appears as an extra in theatre scenes in both Finding Father Christmas and Engaging Father Christmas.

Production and filming

Adaptation

Gunn's literary agent was approached in 2011 by a production company looking for Christmas novels to adapt into screenplays. Her agent suggested the novel "Finding Father Christmas".  On pitching the story to Hallmark Movies & Mysteries in 2012, it was rejected due its lack of romance.  Gunn's agent then made the suggestion to combine the first novel with parts of its sequel, "Engaging Father Christmas", as the latter novel featured a romantic plot for its main character.  The two novels were reworked into a combined treatment, which was again pitched to the channel in 2013.  It was again rejected, but with the possibility of reconsideration if further adaptations were made, in particular relocating the novel from England to North America. Following further adaptations, Hallmark approved the treatment of the novels in 2015, leading to the development of the screenplay. Gunn went on to publish an ebook ("How My Book Became A Movie:A True Story") in 2016, detailing her experiences of the process, from the origins of the novel to the film's production.

Differences from the novel
The first film differs significantly from the novel.  The setting is moved from England to Vermont, the character of Ian is introduced much earlier in the story and several character names were changed. A new introduction to the story was also written, to introduce important backstory. However, author Robin Jones Gunn felt that "the heart of the story I'd written was still there".

The second and third films diverged further from the original story, although author Gunn confirmed that the films still drew upon her novels.

Sequels

Following the success of the first film, star Niall Matter and author Robin Jones Gunn both confirmed in March 2017 that Hallmark were developing a sequel.

On May 9, 2017, Hallmark announced eight new Christmas movies, including a sequel to Finding Father Christmas entitled Engaging Father Christmas. Finding Father Christmas director Terry Ingram was originally approached to direct the sequel, but was unavailable, leading to director David Winning taking the helm. A third film in the series was confirmed by director David Winning and actor Jim Thorburn in interviews given in November 2017.

Filming
All three films were filmed in and around Vancouver, British Columbia. Filming for the first film took place in June 2016, with some scenes shot in the city of Abbotsford, British Columbia. The second film began production in June 2017 and the final installment was filmed in March 2018.

Films

Release
Finding Father Christmas premiered on the Hallmark Movies & Mysteries channel on November 13, 2016. It was subsequently broadcast on the channel a further twenty times in the lead up to Christmas, including broadcast on Christmas Day. The film was released on DVD in the United States in October 2017.

Engaging Father Christmas premiered in the United States on the Hallmark Movies & Mysteries channel on November 12, 2017, shown as a double bill with a rerun of Finding Father Christmas. In Canada, the film was broadcast on Super Channel under the title "A Family for the Holidays", and premiered on November 13, 2017. It premiered in the UK on Sky Cinema on November 28, 2017 under the title Winter Wedding. The film was released on DVD in the United States on October 2, 2018.

Marrying Father Christmas, the third film in the series, premiered in the USA on the Hallmark Movies & Mysteries channel on November 4, 2018, as part of their "Miracles of Christmas" seasonal programming. The film was released on DVD in the United States on October 1, 2019.

Reception

At the time of broadcast, both Finding Father Christmas and Engaging Father Christmas were the highest rated and the most watched premieres in the network's history, with ratings of 1.56 million viewers and 1.84 million viewers respectively. The premiere of Marrying Father Christmas was watched live by 1.44 million viewers.

References

External links
 
 
 
 
 
 

American film series
American Christmas films

Canadian film series
Canadian television films
Canadian Christmas films
2010s romantic drama films
Films shot in British Columbia
Christmas television films
Film series based on American novels
Films about weddings
Hallmark Channel original films
Television film series
2010s Canadian films